The Turama River is a river of Papua New Guinea. This, combined with its location at the head of the Gulf of Papua, results in tidal bores sweeping up the river. The effects are noticeable as far as 100 km upstream.

See also

List of rivers of Papua New Guinea
Turama–Kikorian languages

Rivers of Papua New Guinea